Tasino is a rural locality (a settlement) in Posyolok Urshelsky, Gus-Khrustalny District, Vladimir Oblast, Russia. The population was 15 as of 2010. There are 5 streets.

Geography 
Tasino is located 43 km southwest of Gus-Khrustalny (the district's administrative centre) by road. Izbishchi is the nearest rural locality.

References 

Rural localities in Gus-Khrustalny District